Homonoea boudanti is a species of beetle in the family Cerambycidae. It was described by Karl-Ernst Hüdepohl in 1995. It is known from the Philippines.

References

Homonoeini
Beetles described in 1995
Insects of the Philippines